Fifteen presidents of the United States have made thirty-four presidential visits to Mexico. The first visit by an incumbent president to Mexico was made in 1909 by William Howard Taft. It was only the second time in U.S. history that a president left the country while in office.

Table of visits

See also
 Mexico–United States relations
 Foreign policy of the United States
 Foreign relations of the United States

References

Mexico–United States relations
Lists of United States presidential visits